There are a number of elementary schools named Hoover Elementary School:

 Hoover Elementary School (Westminster, California)
 Hoover Elementary School (Santa Ana, California)
 Hoover Elementary School (Corvallis, Oregon)